Dmitry Kalineyko (born 9 April 1999) is a Belarusian former professional footballer.

References

External links 
 
 

1999 births
Living people
Belarusian footballers
Association football forwards
FC Energetik-BGU Minsk players
FC Smolevichi players